The Siletz River Volcanics, located in the Oregon Coast Range, United States, are a sequence of basaltic pillow lavas that make up part of Siletzia. The basaltic pillow lavas originally came from submarine volcanoes that existed during the Eocene.

Description 
The Paleocene to Eocene volcanics consist of volcanism flows and sills of tholeitic to alkalic basalts with associated tuff-breccia, siltstone and sandstone. The flows are vesiculated with zeolite filled amygdules.

The volcanics originated as oceanic crust and seamounts. Potassium argon dating gives ages of 58.1 ± 1.5 to 50.7 ± 3.1 Ma; Selandian to Ypresian.

The sequence has been divided into a lower pillowed tholeiitic unit and an upper porphyritic alkali basalt unit.

The volcanics occur in the following counties of western Oregon: Benton, Coos, Douglas, Lane, Lincoln, Polk, Tillamook, Washington and Yamhill.

Fossil content 
The sedimentary beds at the Ellendale Basalt and Portland Cement Company Quarries, interbeds in the upper part of the Siletz River volcanics,  have provided fossils of the archaeogastropods Pleurotomaria (Entemnotrochus) baldwini, P. (E.) schencki and P. (E.) siletzensis.

See also 

 Coldwater Beds of British Columbia
 Golden Valley Formation of North Dakota
 Hanna Formation of Wyoming
 Indian Meadows Formation of Wyoming
 Margaret Formation of Ellesmere Island, Northwest Territories and Nunavut
 Nanjemoy Formation of Virginia, Maryland and District of Columbia
 Paskapoo Formation of Alberta
 Wasatch Formation of Colorado, Idaho, Montana, New Mexico, Wyoming and Utah
 Washakie Formation of Colorado and Wyoming
 Willwood Formation of Wyoming

References

Bibliography

Further reading 
 Baldwin, E.M., 1974, Eocene stratigraphy of southwestern Oregon: Oregon Department of Geology and Mineral Industries Bulletin 83, 40 p.
 Duncan, R.A., 1982, A captured island chain in the coast Range of Oregon and Washington: Journal of Geophysical Research, v. 87, p. 10, 827–10, 837
 Snavely, P.D., MacLeod, N.S., and Wagner, H.C., 1973, Miocene tholeiitic basalts of coastal Oregon and Washington and their relations to coeval basalts of the Columbia Plateau: Geological Society of America Bulletin, v. 84, p. 387–424

Paleogene geology of Oregon
Volcanism of Oregon
Paleocene volcanism
Paleocene Series of North America
Selandian Stage
Thanetian Stage
Bridgerian
Tiffanian
Wasatchian
Eocene volcanism
Eocene Series of North America
Ypresian Stage
Oregon Coast Range
Yellowstone hotspot
Seamounts of the Pacific Ocean
Siltstone formations
Sandstone formations of the United States
Tuff formations
Paleontology in Oregon
Formations
Formations
Formations
Formations
Formations
Formations
Formations
Formations
Formations